Kahriz-e Qaleh Daresi (also Romanized as Kahrīz-e Qal‘eh Daresī; also known as Kahrīz) is a village in Chaybasar-e Jonubi Rural District, in the Central District of Maku County, West Azerbaijan Province, Iran. At the 2006 census, its population was 124, in 23 families.

References 

Populated places in Maku County